Brandstorp Church is a wooden church building in Brandstorp in Sweden. Belonging to Brandstorp Parish of the Church of Sweden, it was built between 1694 and 1698.

References

External links

Churches in the Diocese of Skara
Churches completed in 1698
17th-century Church of Sweden church buildings
Churches in Habo Municipality
Wooden churches in Sweden
1698 establishments in Sweden